Jae U. Jung is an expert in the molecular biology of herpes viruses and their gene products as they relate to cell biology, biochemistry and immunology.  His research addresses several key biological features of virus-host interactions, with a focus on host immune responses to viruses, mechanisms by which viruses induce tumors, and the ability of viruses to establish lifelong infections.

Education
1982 B.S. Seoul National University, Korea
1984 M.S. Seoul National University, Korea
1989 Ph.D. University of California-Davis

Known for
Virus-induced cancer
Cell death: apoptosis and autophagy
Host and virus controls of interferon-mediated antiviral activity
Embryonic stem cell study for viral replication

Publications

Awards and honors
1986  Distinguished Graduate Fellowship  
1987 - 1989  Jastro Shields Graduate Research Award  
1998  Appreciation award from Korean Bioscience Association  
1999  SBR/CKD Bioscience Award  
2000 - 2005  The Leukemia & Lymphoma Society Scholar Award  
2004  NEBS-KOSEN Research Award  
2012  Ho-Am Prize in Medicine

References

External links
Pibbs.usc.edu

1960 births
Living people
University of California, Davis alumni
Recipients of the Ho-Am Prize in Medicine